Polystichum luctuosum is a species of fern known by the common names Korean rock fern and Tsushima holly fern. It is a small, clump-forming, tufted, evergreen to semi-evergreen fern native to Japan, Korea, Taiwan, China, Vietnam, and Thailand, as well as southern Africa. The fern grows to about 1–1.5 feet in height, with a spread of 1–1.5 feet, with stipe up to 30 cm long, pale to mid-brown, with dark brown to almost black scales, and bi-pinnate, glossy, dark green fronds.

Synonyms 
 Aspidium aculeatum var. pallescens Franch.
 Aspidium luctuosum Kunze
 Aspidium tsus-simense Hook.
 Polystichum falcilobum Ching
 Polystichum tsus-simense (Hook.) J. Sm.
 Polystichum tsus-simense var. pallescens Franch.

References 

 Index Fil. 95 1858.
 The Plant List entry
 JSTOR entry
 Missouri Botanical Garden entry
 Flora of Zimbabwe entry

luctuosum